This is a list of the German Media Control Top100 Singles Chart number-ones of 1973.

See also
List of number-one hits (Germany)

References
 German Singles Chart Archives from 1956
 Media Control Chart Archives from 1960

1973 in Germany
1973 record charts
1973